South Attleboro is a neighborhood of Attleboro, a city in Bristol County, Massachusetts, United States. It is perhaps best known for the South Attleboro station on the Attleboro/Stoughton Line of the MBTA Commuter Rail. U.S. 1 (the old Norfolk and Bristol Turnpike) and Route 1A (the old Lower Boston Post Road) pass through the area, which lies just north of the Rhode Island state line.

South Attleboro is home to 2 schools: Robert J Coelho Middle School and Hill Roberts Elementary School. Lees Pond Park, off of Route 1, attracts many locals for activities such as fishing, basketball, baseball, and swimming in one of the city pools. The South Attleboro Lions Club on Highland Avenue hosts the annual Lees Pond Festival.

Route 1 hosts many businesses and fast food restaurants. Depending on the boundaries, South Attleboro is home to approximately 7-10 thousand people.

History
Before the end of the industrial boom, most residents worked in the mills of Pawtucket and Central Falls, RI. In addition, the H&B factory on the state line employed over 1 thousand workers before shutting down in 1957. The factory was demolished in early 2016.

For several decades starting in the 1920s, South Attleboro was known for Wightman's Diner on Boston Post Road (aka Washington Street, or U.S. Route 1). The diner started out as a lunch wagon in 1923, and expanded by connecting multiple lunch cars by the Worcester Lunch Car Company and Jerry O'Mahony Diner Company. By the 1930s it advertised itself locally as the "largest diner in the world." In addition, its Old Mexico Room offered fine foods and liquors, a dance floor surface, and floor show. The diner closed in 1946. By the 1960s, the location was occupied by Almac's market and later Yankee Spirits.

In popular culture
South Attleboro is occasionally referenced in the animated series Family Guy, as being home of "Jack's Joke Shop." The real Jack's Joke Shop was located on  Tremont Street in Boston until it closed in 2007.

References

External links
 City Guide for All of the Attleboroughs
 Business Profile for Jack's Joke Shop
 City data.com

Attleboro, Massachusetts
Neighborhoods in Massachusetts
Populated places in Bristol County, Massachusetts
Providence metropolitan area